The Polish Figure Skating Championships are a figure skating competition held annually to determine the national medalists of Poland. The event has been held annually since 1922. Medals may be awarded in the disciplines of men's singles (since 1922), ladies' singles (since 1930), pair skating (since 1922), ice dancing (since 1956), and synchronized skating.

In the 2008–09 season, Poland and its two southern neighbors, the Czech Republic and Slovakia, began holding their national championships together, alternating the host each year. The Three National Championships became the Four National Championships when Hungary joined in the 2013–14 season. The results in each discipline are separated according to nationality to form each country's national standings.

Senior medalists

Men

Ladies

Pairs

Ice dancing

Junior medalists
The early results for the junior categories are partial due to the lack of information on it, as well as on the exact time of the first Junior Polish National Championships being held.

Men

Ladies

Pairs

Ice dancing

Advanced novice medalists
The early results for the novice categories are partial due to the lack of information on it, as well as on the exact time of the first Polish Novice Championships being held.

Men

Ladies

Pairs

Ice dancing

References

External links
 Official site of the Polish Figure Skating Association
 Results at the Polish Figure Skating Association

 
Figure skating national championships
Figure skating in Poland